The regiment and brigade size units were main units of SFR Yugoslav Air Force during its existence, as parts of aviation divisions, commands and corps. Aviation regiments until "Drvar" reorganizations composed from three aircraft squadrons and one technical squadron, but after they composed from two to five aircraft squadrons. By the middle 1960s, some regiments had become brigades as they composed from more squadrons. They were equal to a USAF wing or RAF group. In organization of the Yugoslav Air Force there were also other branch regiments and regiments, as signal, air reconnaissance/intelligence and guidance, air defense and paratroop.

Aviation regiments and brigades

Formed in period 1944-1948
1st Fighter Regiment
113th Fighter Aviation Regiment
111th Fighter Aviation Regiment
112th Fighter Aviation Regiment
1st Yugoslav Fighter Regiment
254th Fighter Aviation Regiment
422nd Assault Aviation Regiment
423rd Assault Aviation Regiment
421st Assault Aviation Regiment
2nd Yugoslav Assault Regiment
554th Assault Aviation Regiment
1st Transport Aviation Regiment
42nd Bomber Aviation Regiment
41st Bomber Aviation Regiment
43rd Bomber Aviation Regiment
Night Bomber Aviation Regiment
1st Training Aviation Regiment
2nd Training Aviation Regiment
3rd Training Aviation Regiment
Reconnaissance Aviation Regiment

Renamed in 1948
81st Assault Aviation Regiment (Fighter-Bomber)
83rd Fighter Aviation Regiment (Fighter-Bomber)
88th Bomber Aviation Regiment (Fighter, Fighter-Bomber)
94th Fighter Aviation Regiment (Fighter-Bomber)
96th Assault Aviation Regiment (Fighter-Bomber)
97th Bomber Aviation Regiment (Anti-Submarine, Support, Helicopter)
101st Fighter-Training Aviation Regiment (Training)
103rd Reconnaissance Aviation Regiment
104th Training Aviation Regiment 
105th Assault-Training Aviation Regiment (Training, Fighter-Bomber)
107th Assault Aviation Regiment (Fighter, Fighter-Bomber, Helicopter, Support, Aviation, Mixed)
109th Bomber Aviation Regiment (Fighter, Fighter-Bomber)
111th Assault Aviation Regiment (Fighter-Bomber)
116th Fighter Aviation Regiment
117th Fighter Aviation Regiment (Fighter-Bomber)
119th Transport Aviation Regiment (Support, Helicopter)
184th Light Night Bomber Aviation Regiment

Formed in 1949
185th Mixed Aviation Regiment (Fighter, Technical Group, Training, Fighter-Training, Fighter-Bomber)
198th Fighter Aviation Regiment (Fighter-Bomber)
204th Fighter Aviation Regiment (Fighter-Bomber)
138th Assault Aviation Regiment (Fighter-Bomber)
172nd Assault Aviation Regiment (Fighter-Bomber)

Formed after 1950
267th Aviation Regiment of School of Reserve Officers 
141st Training Aviation Regiment 
150th Fighter-Bomber Aviation Regiment 
184th Reconnaissance Aviation Regiment 
40th Fighter Aviation Regiment 
81st Support Aviation Regiment 
111th Support Aviation Regiment (Transport, Helicopter)
138th Transport Aviation Regiment 
82nd Aviation Brigade (Fighter-Bomber Regiment)
98th Aviation Brigade (Fighter-Bomber Regiment)
83rd Fighter Aviation Regiment (Aviation Brigade)
138th Transport Aviation Brigade
701st Aviation Brigade

Non-aviation regiments and brigades

Air defense
250th Air Defense Missile Regiment (Brigade)
155th Air Defense Missile Regiment
350th Air Defense Missile Regiment
450th Air Defense Missile Regiment
200th Air Defense Light Missile-Artillery Regiment
399th Air Defense Light Missile-Artillery Regiment
492nd Air Defense Light Missile-Artillery Regiment

Paratroop
63rd Paratroop Brigade

Signal
322nd Signal Regiment

Air reconnaissance/intelligence and guidance
211st Air Reconnaissance Regiment
275th Air Reconnaissance Regiment
137th Air Reconnaissance Regiment
1st Air Reconnaissance Regiment
5th Air Reconnaissance Regiment
7th Air Reconnaissance Regiment
3rd Air Reconnaissance Regiment

Notes and references

Yugoslav Air Force 1942-1992, Bojan Dimitrijević, Institute for modern history, Belgrade, 2006

Military units and formations of the Yugoslav Air Force
Yugoslav Air Force